Metro Bilbao is the company that runs lines 1 and 2 of the Bilbao metro. The ownership of the metro infrastructure is shared by the Biscay Transport Consortium and Euskal Trenbide Sarea.

History 
Metro Bilbao, S.A. was established on 28 February 1993 with a capital of 10 million pesetas and the Biscay Transport Consortium as its only shareholder. The Basque narrow-gauge railway network in which the Bilbao metro has its origins (line 1 took over most of the existing Bilbao-Plentzia railway) had been managed by Basque Railways (known as Euskotren after 1996) since 1982. However, a separate company was established to manage the metro.

The management of the metro system by an independent company was a result of the 1975 law that established the Biscay Transport Consortium and the 1983 Law of Historical Territories. The creation of a separate company has been criticized as a political decision that left Basque Railways in a weaker position (the Bilbao-Plentzia line was the busiest of its network) and that hindered the reuse of existing infrastructures (particularly in the Txorierri line).

Unlike the first two lines of the system, line 3 of the metro is run by Euskotren. That was the original intention when the line was tendered in 2009, but it was later announced that Metro Bilbao would be the operator. In 2013 Euskotren was confirmed as the operator of the new line.

References

External links 
 

1993 establishments in the Basque Country (autonomous community)
Railway companies established in 1993
Railway companies of the Basque Country (autonomous community)
Government-owned companies of Spain
Organisations based in Bilbao
Bilbao metro